Montagny may refer to:

In France:
Montagny, Loire
Montagny, Rhône
Montagny, Savoie
Montagny AOC, a wine appellation in the Côte Chalonnaise subregion of Burgundy.

In Switzerland:
Montagny, Fribourg, consisting of
Montagny-les-Monts
Montagny-la-Ville
Montagny-près-Yverdon, Vaud

See also
 Montagny-en-Vexin 
 Montagny-lès-Beaune 
 Montagny-lès-Buxy 
 Montagny-les-Lanches 
 Montagny-lès-Seurre 
 Montagny-près-Louhans 
 Montagny-près-Yverdon 
 Montagny-Sainte-Félicité 
 Montagny-sur-Grosne

People
 Franck Montagny, motor racing driver